Chiwana (Quechua chiway mating of birds, -na a suffix, "where the birds mate", Hispanicized spelling Chiguana) is a  mountain in Bolivia. It is located in the Potosí Department, on the border of the Nor Lípez Province, Colcha "K" Municipality, and the Quemes Municipality. The mountain lies at the Chiwana salt flat.

See also 
 Kachi Unu

References 

Mountains of Potosí Department